Piggs Peak is a town in northwestern Eswatini.  It was founded around gold prospecting in 1884, but its main industry is now forestry.  The Phophonyane Falls lie near the town. Piggs Peak Casino takes its name from the area.

Piggs Peak is named after an early resident, William Pigg, who discovered a gold reef here on 26 March 1884.

Sport
Malanti Chiefs F.C. play in Piggs Peak.

References

Populated places in Hhohho Region